The International Collaboration for the Care of the Elderly is the international arm of National Initiative for the Care of the Elderly.  ICCE is funded through the International Partnership Initiative of the Networks of Centres of Excellence and the International Development Research Centre.

Geriatrics organizations